is a passenger railway station located in the city of Imabari, Ehime Prefecture, Japan. It is operated by JR Shikoku and has the station number "Y44".

Lines
Iyo-Kameoka Station is served by the JR Shikoku Yosan Line and is located 161.9 km from the beginning of the line at Takamatsu Station. Connections with other local or limited express trains are needed to travel further east or west along the line.

Layout
The station, which is unstaffed, consists of a side platform and an island platform serving three tracks. A station building serves as a waiting room and is linked to platform 1. Access to platforms 2 and 3 on the island is by means of a footbridge. Parking is available at the station forecourt.

Adjacent stations

History
At that time the station was operated by Japanese Government Railways, later becoming Japanese National Railways (JNR). With the privatization of JNR on 1 April 1987, control of the station passed to JR Shikoku.

Surrounding area
Imabari City Kameoka Elementary School
 Kikuma National Oil Stockpile Base

See also
 List of railway stations in Japan

References

External links

Station timetable

Railway stations in Ehime Prefecture
Railway stations in Japan opened in 1925
Imabari, Ehime